Yellowstone is an unincorporated community in Polk Township, Monroe County, in the U.S. state of Indiana.

History
The community formerly had the name Hunters Creek. A post office was established at Yellowstone in 1887, and remained in operation until 1923.

Geography

References

Unincorporated communities in Monroe County, Indiana
Unincorporated communities in Indiana
Bloomington metropolitan area, Indiana